Vamuzo Phesao was a Naga politician. He became the Chief Minister of Nagaland in 1990. His government was dismissed and President's rule was imposed in 1992

References

Naga people
Chief Ministers of Nagaland
Chief ministers from Naga People's Front politicians
People from Phek district
People from Kohima
1938 births
2000 deaths